Dean White is an American television director and producer.

Career
Some of his directorial credits include: The Shield, Thief, The Unit, Saved, Friday Night Lights, Men in Trees, The Mentalist, CSI: Crime Scene Investigation, Pushing Daisies, Prison Break, Detroit 1-8-7, Law & Order, Past Life, Law & Order: Criminal Intent, V,Once Upon a Time and The 100.

He has produced the series: The Shield, Chicago Hope, The District, and Past Life.

Filmography

References

External links

American television directors
American television producers
Living people
Place of birth missing (living people)
Year of birth missing (living people)